Ledbetter may refer to:

Surname
 Branden Ledbetter, American football player
 Brownie Ledbetter, political activist
 Calvin Ledbetter, Jr., educator and politician
 Eleanor Edwards Ledbetter, American librarian
 Huddie William Ledbetter, the real name of the blues singer Lead Belly
 Jeremiah Ledbetter, American football player
 Jonathan Ledbetter (born 1997), American football player
 Lilly Ledbetter, plaintiff in Ledbetter v. Goodyear Tire & Rubber Co.
 Marshall Ledbetter, protester
 Monte Ledbetter, American football player
 Nathaniel Ledbetter, American politician
 Razor Ledbetter, Major League Baseball pitcher

Places
In the United States:
 Ledbetter, Kentucky
 Ledbetter, Texas, an unincorporated community in northern Fayette County
 Ledbetter Gardens, Dallas, a neighborhood in the West Dallas area of Dallas, Texas
 Ledbetter station, a DART Light Rail station in the southern part of Dallas, Texas
 Leadbetter Beach or Ledbetter Beach, a beach in Santa Barbara, California

Music
 Ledbetter Heights, the debut album by blues guitarist Kenny Wayne Shepherd
 "Yellow Ledbetter", a song by rock band Pearl Jam

Other uses
 Ledbetter v. Goodyear Tire & Rubber Co., 2007 U.S. Supreme Court case

See also

Leadbetter (disambiguation)
Leadbeater, a surname
Leadbeater's (disambiguation)